The men's 200 metre freestyle competition at the 1993 Pan Pacific Swimming Championships took place on August 12 at the Port Island Sports Center.  The last champion was Ian Brown of Australia.

This race consisted of four lengths of the pool, all in freestyle.

Records
Prior to this competition, the existing world and Pan Pacific records were as follows:

Results
All times are in minutes and seconds.

Heats
The first round was held on August 12.

B Final 
The B final was held on August 12.

A Final 
The A final was held on August 12.

References

1993 Pan Pacific Swimming Championships